Simbirsky (Sember) is a rural locality (a khutor) in Maxyutovsky Selsoviet, Kugarchinsky District, Bashkortostan, Russia. The population was 24 as of 2010. There is 1 street.

Geography 
Simbirsky is located 6 km south of Mrakovo (the district's administrative centre) by road.

References 

Rural localities in Kugarchinsky District